Rozet may refer to :
 Rozet, Wyoming, an unincorporated community in Campbell County, Wyoming, United States
 Rozet-Saint-Albin, a commune in the Aisne department in Picardie in northern France
 François Rozet (1899–1994), a French Canadian actor
 Fanny Rozet (1881–1958), French sculptor
 René Rozet (1858–1939), French sculptor

See also
 Roset, a disambiguation page
 Rosette, a disambiguation page